Cathlesichthys is an extinct genus of homostiid arthrodire from Wee Jasper, during the Early Devonian.

Etymology 
The generic epithet honors Ian and Helen Cathles, being a compound of their surname combined with the Greek word for fish ιχθύς (ichthýs).  The specific epithet refers to the location of where it was found (Wee Jasper).

Description 
Cathlesichthys is known from an incomplete paranuchal, and nuchal plates, attaining a skull length of around 20 cm.

References 

Homostiidae
Arthrodire genera
Placoderms of Australia
Fossil taxa described in 2004